Westwood Hills is a city in Johnson County, Kansas, United States.  As of the 2020 census, the population of the city was 400.  It is the most densely populated city in the Kansas City Metropolitan Area at 6,240 people per square mile. It borders Kansas City, Missouri.

History
Westwood Hills had its start in the year 1922 when developer J.C. Nichols platted the subdivision and began building.

Geography
Westwood Hills is located at  (39.039055, -94.610808).

Demographics

2010 census
As of the census of 2010, there were 359 people, 167 households, and 105 families living in the city. The racial makeup of the city was 94.4% White, 1.7% African American, 1.9% Asian, and 1.9% from two or more races. Hispanic or Latino of any race were 3.1% of the population.

There were 167 households, of which 25.7% had children under the age of 18 living with them, 54.5% were married couples living together, 6.6% had a female householder with no husband present, 1.8% had a male householder with no wife present, and 37.1% were non-families. 29.3% of all households were made up of individuals, and 10.2% had someone living alone who was 65 years of age or older. The average household size was 2.15 and the average family size was 2.65.

The median age in the city was 47.1 years. 17.8% of residents were under the age of 18; 4.2% were between the ages of 18 and 24; 26.2% were from 25 to 44; 34.3% were from 45 to 64; and 17.5% were 65 years of age or older. The gender makeup of the city was 50.1% male and 49.9% female.

2000 census
As of the census of 2000, there were 378 people, 170 households, and 116 families living in the city. The racial makeup of the city was 93.92% White, 1.59% African American, 0.26% Native American, 3.17% Asian, and 1.06% from two or more races. Hispanic or Latino of any race were 1.06% of the population.

There were 170 households, out of which 28.2% had children under the age of 18 living with them, 59.4% were married couples living together, 7.6% had a female householder with no husband present, and 31.2% were non-families. 25.9% of all households were made up of individuals, and 4.1% had someone living alone who was 65 years of age or older. The average household size was 2.22 and the average family size was 2.70.

In the city, the population was spread out, with 21.7% under the age of 18, 3.2% from 18 to 24, 33.1% from 25 to 44, 31.7% from 45 to 64, and 10.3% who were 65 years of age or older. The median age was 41 years. For every 100 females, there were 98.9 males. For every 100 females age 18 and over, there were 93.5 males.

The median income for a household in the city was $81,812, and the median income for a family was $108,732. Males had a median income of $76,250 versus $52,188 for females. The per capita income for the city was $48,256. About 1.8% of families and 2.4% of the population were below the poverty line, including none of those under the age of eighteen or sixty-five or over.

Transportation

Major highways

References

Further reading

External links
 City of Westwood Hills
 Westwood Hills - Directory of Public Officials
 Westwood Hills city map, KDOT

Cities in Kansas
Cities in Johnson County, Kansas